Shkije or Shkje, is a pejorative term used in the Gheg dialect of Albanian to refer to non-Albanians such as Serbs, Macedonians, Montenegrins, Greeks, Italians, and to a lesser extent Croats and Bosniaks. 

The Arvanites in Greece use the version shkla to refer to the Greek population, while the Arbereshe in Italy, a substantial part of which originates from the Arvanites, use the words shklan and shklerisht which mean "that does not speak Arbereshe", or "that speaks an incomprehensible language", referring to the Latin languages. 

It is derived from either from the Venetian schiavone meaning the same  or from the term "Slavs",  which contained the traditional meaning of “the neighbouring foreigner”.

It was widely used in the Albanian literature as well, i.e. Lahuta e Malcís (1937) of Gjergj Fishta (1871–1940). Sami Frasheri also used the term in his works. 

During the Yugoslav Wars, Albanian newspapers often called Serbs "Shkja". Șchei was also a word that Romanians used to name Slavs (Bulgarians).

Word forms

See also
Șchei
Shqiptar
List of ethnic slurs

References

Albanian words and phrases
Exonyms
Anti-Serbian sentiment
Ethnonyms